"I've Got You Under My Skin" is a song by Cole Porter.

I've Got You Under My Skin may also refer to:

 "I've Got You Under My Skin" (Charmed), a 1998 episode of the television series Charmed (see Charmed (season 1))
 I've Got You Under My Skin (Angel), a 2000 episode of the television series Angel

See also 

 Under My Skin (disambiguation)